Leikert is a surname. Notable people with the surname include:

 František Leikert (1914–?), Czech diver
 Katja Leikert (Katja Rüb, born 1975), German politician

See also
 Leiker